Nick Cannon Presents: Short Circuitz is a sketch comedy show starring Nick Cannon on MTV that debuted April 5, 2007. The show was cancelled and pulled from MTV on April 30, 2007, due to low ratings. A month after the show's cancellation, the series returned on June 7, 2007 as part of the Nick Cannon Power Hour, but was soon cancelled again.

Cast list
The Show's cast is made up of mostly players from Nick's other series "Wild 'N Out"
 Nick Cannon
 Affion Crockett
 Eliza Coupe
 Leonard Robinson
 Mikey Day
 Taran Killam
 Katt Williams
 Sean Lavallies
 Eric Murphy

Episode list

Episode 1
Air Date: 4/5/07

Starring: Taran Killam, Affion Crockett, Eliza Coupe, Mikey Day, Leonard Robinson, Nick Cannon, Sean Lavallies, Eric Murphy

Featuring: Katt Williams

Guest Starring : Sway

Sketches:
 Rappers Against Child Support
 Judge Mo Dollars (extended Wild N' Out skit)
 Career Boosters
 The Claymate Show
 Ludacris Freestyle (Affion Crockett)

Episode 2
Air Date: 4/12/07

Starring: Mikey Day, Nick Cannon, Affion Crockett, Leonard Robinson

Featuring: Spliff Star, James Adomian as George W. Bush

Guest Starring: Ice-T and CoCo

Sketches:
 Old People'ing (drive-by parody)
 Ice T-vo
 Greatest Ass Whuppins (Lionel Vs Brenda)
 Spontaneous Hypeman Syndrome
 Working With White People
 Next: School Teacher Edition
 Suge Knight Light
 Hell Nah Kanye (Kanye diss by George Bush)

Episode 3
Air Date: 4/19/07

Starring: Taran Killam, Affion Crockett, Eliza Coupe, Mikey Day, Leonard Robinson, Nick Cannon

Featuring: Katt Williams

Guest Starring: Snoop Dogg and Ant

Sketches:
 Lessons In The Workplace #204: First Day On The Job
 Judge Mo Dollars (extended Wild N' Out skit)
 Coming Out Insurance
 Yo Momma - Afghanistan
 Davonte Blaine - Street Magic
 Yak'n Off FM
 Jay's Anatomy (Eric Murphy)

Episode 4 *
Air Date: 6/7/07

Starring: Taran Killam, Affion Crockett, Eliza Coupe, Mikey Day, Leonard Robinson, Nick Cannon

Sketches:
 BBS
 Junk in the Trunk1
 Cribs: Sean Lavallies and Jessica Alba
 Back That S*** Up
 MTV Scarred Spoof (parody of fellow MTV show Scarred by LurkSquad)1
 Simmons & Simmons pt.1
 Camel Toe
 Simmons & Simmons pt.2
 Aching for Aiken (The Claymate Show)
 Skanks on a Plane (parody of Snakes on a Plane)1
 Sean John Silver's (Leonard Robinson)

Episode 5 *
Air Date: 6/14/07

Starring: Taran Killam, Affion Crockett, Eliza Coupe, Mikey Day, Leonard Robinson, Nick Cannon

Featuring: Katt Williams and Kevin Hart

Guest Starring: Lil Jon

Sketches:
 Thanks White People
 Judge Mo Dollars (extended Wild N' Out skit)
 Geico Ad1
 Greatest Ass Whuppins (Björk)
 Bootleg Movie Awards pt. 1
 Erase Racism1
 Bootleg Movie Awards pt. 2
 Calf-a-Sizer 3000
 No More Drama (Nyima Funk)

Episode 6 *
Air Date: 6/21/07

Starring: Taran Killam, Affion Crockett, Eliza Coupe, Mikey Day, Leonard Robinson, Nick Cannon

Guest Starring: Lil Jon

Sketches:
 Davonte Blaine: Street Magic
 Rap Producer: Jesus
 Beverly Hills ATM
 Vagina 1011
 Action 6 News at 61
 The Claymate Show
 Dane Cooks
 Club Clinic
 Scarred by Scarred1
 Yak'n Off
 Facebook Livin1
 Yo Mamma- Harlem, NY (Sean Lavallies and Eric Murphy)

Episode 7 **
Air Date: 6/28/07

Starring: Taran Killam, Affion Crockett, Eliza Coupe, Mikey Day, Leonard Robinson, Nick Cannon

Featuring: Katt Williams

Guest Starring : Sway Calloway

Sketches:
 Rappers Against Child Support
 Judge Mo Dollars (extended Wild N' Out skit)
 Career Boosters
 Bi-Curious by Greg Scarnici 1
 The Negrotiator
 The Profane Gourmet1
 Day Spa1
 Sports Daily With Mary Banks
 Ludacris' Freestyle Video (Affion Crockett)

Episode 8 **
Air Date: 7/5/07

Starring: Mikey Day, Nick Cannon, Affion Crockett, Leonard Robinson

Featuring: James Adomian as George W. Bush

Guest Starring: Ice T and CoCo

Sketches:
 Old People'ing (drive-by parody)
 Ice T-vo
 Working With White People
 Jewdacris1
 Next: School Teacher Edition pt. 1
 Suge Knight Light
 Next: School Teacher Edition pt. 2
 Get Topless1
 Horny Doctors1
 Hell Nah Kanye (Kanye diss by George W. Bush)

1 These skits are the winning videos from the Short Circuitz web site promo, where viewers can send in a taped parody of a show, commercial, music video, etc. and win $1,000 in the process

*These episodes featured a video-like set up with a playlist on the left side of the screen.

**These episodes featured the same (with the exception of one or two) sketches as previous episodes with the addition of the three viewer submitted sketches.

Website
Short Circuitz featured a Web 2.0 community at ShortCircuitz.mtv.com, where viewers were encouraged to upload their own homemade parody videos of various media phenomena, including music videos, commercials and television programs. Users on the site rated and commented on each other's videos.

References

External links
 Short Circuitz Home Page
 

2000s American black television series
2000s American sketch comedy television series
2007 American television series debuts
2007 American television series endings
English-language television shows
MTV original programming